Trnovec nad Váhom is a village and municipality in Šaľa District, in the Nitra Region of south-west Slovakia.

Geography
The village lies at an altitude of 115 metres and covers an area of 32.537 km².

History

In historical records the village was first mentioned in 1113. Until 1918 the area was part of the Austro-Hungarian empire.  By the Treaty of Trianon the area was awarded to the newly formed state of Czechoslovakia. Between 1938 and 1945 Trnovec nad Váhom once more  became part of Miklós Horthy's Hungary through the First Vienna Award. From 1945 until the Velvet Divorce, it was part of Czechoslovakia. Since then it has been part of Slovakia.

Demographics
According to the 2011 census, the municipality had 2,652 inhabitants. 2,018 of inhabitants were Slovaks, 469 Hungarians, 16 Czechs and 149 others and unspecified.

People
Famous people born in the village include Peter Andruška a poet and Eduard Kukan politician. Emmerich Weisz an eminent Cloth Merchant who moved to Vienna and finally to London to found the  WM Woollen Export Co. LTD. Emerich Weisz had 11 brothers and sisters. His mother died when he was 11 years old and after his father remarried, he was brought up by his eldest sister. He was of Jewish descent. In his youth he played football for the MTK club in Budapest, moving to Vienna to found his company Emerich Weisz. In 1936 he founded WM Woollen Export Co Ltd in London hoping to escape the developing antisemitism in Austria. The Anschluss in Austria forced him to emigrate to the UK in 1937. Emerich and Emily Weisz had one daughter Olga who had four children and they adopted their first born Grandson Brian Weisz in 1946. Brian bought the business in 1974 after his Grandmother retired. Brian sold the business in 2004. Emerich Weisz was born in 1891 and died in London 21st Oct 1963.

Facilities
The village has a public library a gym and a football pitch.

References

External links
http://www.statistics.sk/mosmis/eng/run.html

Villages and municipalities in Šaľa District